Scopula kagiata is a species of moth of the family Geometridae. It was described by Max Bastelberger in 1909. It is endemic to Taiwan.

References

External links
 

Moths described in 1909
kagiata
Taxa named by Max Bastelberger
Moths of Taiwan